Al-Majidiyyeh Mosque is a mosque located in Beirut, Lebanon.

Overview
Originally a fort, the building was converted into a mosque in the mid-19th century and named after Sultan Abdul Majid. Damaged during the Lebanese Civil War, the mosque was restored in 2004.

Construction
Originally a fort overlooking the harbor, Al-Majidiyyeh Mosque was later converted into an Ottoman army munitions magazine and a warehouse for wood merchants. In 1841, a group of  Beirut citizens collected funds to restore it, adding a new building on its western side. Three years later, they converted it into a mosque. The mosque was enlarged in 1906. In 1974, the monument was entirely renovated. The mosque was severely damaged during the early years of the Civil War (1975-1990). Post-war restoration started in 2000 and was completed in 2004. It included the reinstatement of an entrance from Khan Antoun Bey Square and the addition of a new, taller minaret.

History
Al-Majidiyyeh Mosque was originally a fort overlooking the harbor, and formed an integral part of the city ramparts. Deserted, it then served as an Ottoman army munitions magazine and as a warehouse used by wood merchants. In 1841, a group of Beirut citizens collected funds to restore it, adding a new building on its western side. Three years later, they converted it into a mosque and named it ‘Al-Majidiyyeh,’ in honor of Sultan Abdul Majid.  The mosque was enlarged in 1906 when pointed arches - fashionable in Beirut at the end of the 19th century – were added to its façade. In 1974, the monument was entirely renovated. Its location between Khan Antoun Bey and Souk Al-Tawileh made it very vulnerable and the mosque was severely damaged during the early years of the Civil War (1975-1990). Post-war restoration started in 2000 and was completed four years later. It included the reinstatement of an entrance from Khan Antoun Bey Square and the addition of a new, taller minaret.

Timeline

1841: A group of Beirut citizens collected funds to restore a fort overlooking the harbor by adding a new building on its western side.

1844: The fort was converted into a mosque and named ‘al-Majidiyyeh,’ in honor of Sultan Abdul Majid.  

1906: The mosque was enlarged.

1974: Renovation of the entire mosque. 

1975-1990: The mosque was severely damaged during the Civil War due to its location.

2000: Start of the post-war restoration of the mosque.

2004: Mosque completely restored.

See also
 Trablos Street
 Beirut Souks
 Souk al-Tawileh

References 
 Al-Wali, Sheikh Mohammad Taha (1973) Tarikh al-masajid wal jawami’ al-sharifa fi Bayrout, Dar al-Kotob, Beirut.
 Hallaq, Hassan (1987) Al-tarikh alijtima'i wa al-siyasi wa al-iqtisadi fi Bayrut, [Social, Political and Economic History of Beirut], Dar al-Jami'at, Beirut.
 Hallaq, Hassan (1987) Bayrut al-mahrousa fil'ahd al-'uthmâni, [Beirut during the Ottoman Period], Dar al-Jami’at, Beirut.
 Les lieux de culte au Liban. Ministère du Tourisme, Beyrouth.

Buildings and structures in Beirut
Monuments and memorials in Lebanon
Mosques in Beirut
Tourist attractions in Beirut